The 1928 Italian Grand Prix was a Grand Prix motor race run on 9 September 1928, at Monza.  It was run over 60 laps, and was won by Louis Chiron driving a Bugatti 37A. It was the 8th Italian Grand Prix. This race was also the VI Grand Prix d'Europe.

This race was marred by the death of at least 22 spectators as well as driver Emilio Materassi on lap 17, when Materassi lost control of his car on the main straight at over 200 km/h while trying to overtake Giulio Foresti. The car swerved to the left of the track, bounced over a three-meter deep and four-meter wide protection ditch and a fence and crashed into the grandstand, killing him along with 22 spectators. Other sources have stated that 27 spectators were killed overall, but this is unconfirmed.

By either estimation this is the worst accident, with respect to the number of lives lost, to occur at a Grand Prix and it is only surpassed by the 1955 Le Mans disaster in the history of motor racing. As a result the Italian Grand Prix was to not be held until 1931.

Classification 

Fastest Lap: Luigi Arcangeli, 3m37.4 (165.59 km/h)

External links

Italian Grand Prix
Italian Grand Prix
Grand Prix